Richard Frederick Stahlman (October 20, 1902 – May 11, 1970) was an American football offensive lineman. He played seven seasons in the National Football League and one season in the first American Football League.

References

External links 

1902 births
1970 deaths
American football offensive linemen
Chicago Bears players
Green Bay Packers players
New York Giants players
Akron Pros players
Hammond Pros players
Kenosha Maroons players
Kansas City Blues (NFL) players
Northwestern Wildcats football players
Players of American football from Chicago
Chicago Bulls (American football) players
Rock Island Independents (AFL) players
DePaul Blue Demons football players